The Western Area or Freetown Peninsula (formerly the Colony of Sierra Leone) is one of five principal divisions of Sierra Leone. It comprises the oldest city and national capital Freetown and its surrounding towns and countryside. It covers an area of 557 km2 and has a population of 1,447,271. The Western Area is located mostly around the peninsula and is divided into two districts: the Western Area Rural and the Western Area Urban.

Geography
Western Area is the wealthiest region of Sierra Leone, having the largest economy, the country's financial and cultural center, as well as the seat of the country's national government. Unlike the other regions in Sierra Leone, the western area is not a province.

It is divided into two districts:
Western Area Rural
Western Area Urban

Freetown serves as the administrative headquarters of both the Western Area and the Urban District, and served as the capital of the Rural District until 2009 when it was formally moved to the city of Waterloo.

Borders
To the northeast, the Western Area borders the North-Western Province, and to the southeast it borders the Southern Province. However, most of the boundaries of the Western Area is the shoreline of the Atlantic Ocean. The Western Area is the only region of Sierra Leone without a foreign border.

Cities, towns and villages include 
Freetown, largest city and national capital
Waterloo, second largest city and capital of the Western Area Rural District
Newton
Benguema
Leicester
Tombo
Grafton
Adonkia
lakka
Tokeh
Kwama
Bureh Town
Grafton
York
Lakka
Tokeh
Kwama
Samuel Town
Kola Town
Joe Town
Charlotte
Sussex
Bathurst
Baw Baw
Dublin
Ricketts
Fogbo
Gloucester
Kent
Kerry Town
Kebbie Town
Tissana
Bathkump
Kossoh Town
Cole Town
Rokel
Rokupa
Russell
Stones Town
Fogbo
Koya
Bunce Island, an island 
Banana Islands, including (Dublin Island and Ricketts Island).

Religion

See also
Subdivisions of Sierra Leone

References

External links

 
Provinces of Sierra Leone